Tiffin may refer to:

Tiffin, a light meal eaten during the day

People
Annabel Tiffin, presenter of the regional BBC news programme, North West Tonight
Charles Tiffin, architect
Edward Tiffin (1766–1829), the first governor of Ohio
Helen Tiffin, professor of English
Jock Tiffin (1896–1966), general secretary of the British Transport and General Workers' Union (TGWU)
Pamela Tiffin (1942–2020), American actress

Places
In the United States:
Tiffin, Iowa
Tiffin, Missouri
Tiffin, Ohio
Tiffin Township, Adams County, Ohio
Tiffin Township, Defiance County, Ohio
Tiffin River, in Ohio and Michigan

Other
Tiffin (book), cookbook
Tiffin (confectionery), a chocolate confection made with raisins and crushed biscuits
Tiffin carrier or box, another name for the Indian dabba lunchbox
Tiffin School, a selective grammar school for boys in Kingston upon Thames
Tiffin Girls' School, a selective grammar school in Kingston upon Thames
Tiffin University, a private university in Tiffin, Ohio, United States
Glassware made by the United States Glass Company is sometimes referred to as "Tiffin glass"
 Tiffin (horse)